The Aberdeen Hospital is a 24-hour emergency (Level II trauma service), inpatient, outpatient, and community-based services hospital in New Glasgow, Nova Scotia. The hospital has been in existence since 1895. It serves approximately 48,000 people in Pictou County. It is located at 835 East River Road (Route 348) in New Glasgow. It is operated by Nova Scotia Health Authority. The hospital currently has 104 beds.

Internationally renowned sculptor John Wilson donated to the hospital the land on which the Glen Haven Manor was built.

References

External links
Hospital website
Foundation website

Heliports in Canada
Hospitals established in 1895
Hospitals in Pictou County
New Glasgow, Nova Scotia
Registered aerodromes in Nova Scotia
1895 establishments in Canada